The following outline is provided as an overview of and topical guide to Asia.

Asia is the world's largest and most populous continent, located primarily in the eastern and northern hemispheres. It covers 8.7% of the Earth's total surface area (or 30% of its land area) and with approximately 4.655 billion people, it hosts 60% of the world's current human population.

Geography of Asia 

 Atlas of Asia
 List of cities of East Asia

Regions of Asia 

 Central Asia
 East Asia
 North Asia
 South Asia
 Southeast Asia
 Western Asia

Countries of Asia 

List of Asian countries
 Coats of arms of Asia
 Flags of Asia
 List of Asian countries by GDP PPP
 List of Asian countries by population
 List of Asia-related articles

 Akrotiri and Dhekelia

Geographic features of Asia 
 List of World Heritage Sites in Asia
 List of glaciers in Asia
 List of landforms of Asia
 List of mountains in Asia
 List of rivers of Asia

Demography of Asia 

Demographics of Asia

History of Asia 

 Imperialism in Asia
 Events preceding World War II in Asia

History by field 
 History of Cartography in Asia
 Coinage of Asia
 Chronology of European exploration of Asia
 Military history of Asia

History by region 
 History of Central Asia
 History of East Asia
 History of South Asia
 History of Southeast Asia

Culture of Asia 

Culture of Asia
 Asian people
 Etiquette in Asia
 Religion in Asia
 Buddhism
 Islam in Asia
 Christianity in Asia
 Hinduism in Southeast Asia
 World Heritage Sites

The Arts in Asia

Sports in Asia

Environment of Asia 

Environment of Asia
 Fauna of Asia

Economy and infrastructure of Asia 

Economy of Asia
 Wind power in Asia

Communications in Asia 
 List of newspapers in Asia
 List of radio stations in Asia
 List of television stations in Eastern and Southern Asia
 List of television stations in Southeast Asia
 List of television stations in Central and Western Asia

Education in Asia 
 Asian studies
 Central Asian studies
 East Asian studies
 Southeast Asian studies

Governments of Asia

Politics of Asia 

Politics of Asia
 Asian values
 Conflicts in Asia
 Law of Asia
 Political parties in Asia
 Pan-Asianism
 Pirate radio in Asia

See also 

 Continent

 Indexes of articles on the countries of Asia

 Index of Armenia-related articles
 Index of Azerbaijan-related articles
 Index of Bahrain-related articles
 Index of Bangladesh-related articles
 Index of Bhutan-related articles
 Index of Brunei-related articles
 Index of Cambodia-related articles
 Index of China (ROC)-related articles
 Index of Cyprus-related articles
 Index of East Timor-related articles
 Index of Georgia-related articles
 Index of Indonesia-related articles
 Index of Iran-related articles
 Index of Israel-related articles
 Index of Japan-related articles
 Index of Jordan-related articles
 Index of Kazakhstan-related articles
 Index of Kuwait-related articles
 Index of Kyrgyzstan-related articles
 Index of Laos-related articles
 Index of Malaysia-related articles
 Index of Maldives-related articles
 Index of Mongolia-related articles
 Index of Nepal-related articles
 Index of North Korea–related articles
 Index of Oman-related articles
 Index of Philippines-related articles
 Index of Qatar-related articles
 Index of Saudi Arabia-related articles
 Index of Singapore-related articles
 Index of South Korea–related articles
 Index of Syria-related articles
 Index of Tajikistan-related articles
 Index of Turkey-related articles
 Index of Turkmenistan-related articles
 Index of United Arab Emirates-related articles
 Index of Vietnam-related articles
 Index of Yemen-related articles

Notes

External links 

 (European Digital Archive on the Soil Maps of the World - EuDASM)
 Map Asia
 Maps of Asia from the Norman B. Leventhal Map Center at the Boston Public Library

Asia
Asia